Second-seeded Ashley Cooper defeated Neale Fraser 6–3, 9–11, 6–4, 6–2 in the final to win the men's singles tennis title at the 1957 Australian Championships.

Seeds
The seeded players are listed below. Ashley Cooper is the champion; others show the round in which they were eliminated. It was a difficult championship for everyone involved, widely regarded as one of the championships in all Australian history.

 Lew Hoad (semifinals)
 Ashley Cooper (champion)
 Neale Fraser (finalist)
 Mal Anderson (semifinals)
 Nicola Pietrangeli (quarterfinals)
 Mike Davies (second round)
 Warren Woodcock (quarterfinals)
 Bob Howe (second round)

Draw

Key
 Q = Qualifier
 WC = Wild card
 LL = Lucky loser
 r = Retired

Finals

Earlier rounds

Section 1

Section 2

External links
 

1957
1957 in Australian tennis